Shannon James may refer to:

 Shannon James (model) (born 1987), American model
 Shannon James (gridiron football) (born 1983), gridiron football linebacker